(which is also referred to as HS-21) is a unit in the Japanese Maritime Self-Defence Force. It is a part of the Fleet Air Force and comes under the authority of Fleet Air Wing 21. Equipped with Mitsubishi SH-60J & SH-60K anti-submarine helicopters, it is based at Tateyama Air Base in Chiba Prefecture.

Squadron structure
The squadron is composed of two flights: 
 211th Flight is equipped with SH-60J and SH-60K helicopters
 212th flight is equipped with only SH-60K helicopters

References

Aviation in Japan
Units and formations of the Japan Maritime Self-Defense Force
Military units and formations established in 2008